Józef Czapski (3 April 1896 – 12 January 1993) was a Polish artist, author, and critic, as well as an officer of the Polish Army. As a painter, he is notable for his membership in the Kapist movement, which was heavily influenced by Cézanne. Following the Polish Defensive War, he was made a prisoner of war by the Soviets and was among the very few officers to survive the Katyn massacre of 1940. Following the Sikorski-Mayski Agreement, he was an official envoy of the Polish government searching for the missing Polish officers in Russia. After World War II, he remained in exile in the Paris suburb of Maisons-Laffitte, where he was among the founders of Kultura monthly, one of the most influential Polish cultural journals of the 20th century.

Life

Early life

Józef Marian Franciszek hrabia Hutten-Czapski of Leliwa, as was his full name, was born on 3 April 1896 in Prague, to an aristocratic family. Among his relatives were hr. Emeryk Hutten-Czapski, hr. Karol Hutten-Czapski , hr.  Emeryk August Hutten-Czapski, his sister Maria Czapska, as well as Georgy Chicherin. Czapski spent most of his childhood in his family's manor of Przyłuki near Minsk. In 1915 he graduated from a gymnasium in St. Petersburg and joined the cadet corps. Czapski graduated from the law faculty of the University of Saint Petersburg, and in 1917 both joined and later resigned from the 1st Krechowce Uhlan Regiment, a Polish cavalry unit formed in Russia as part of the Polish I Corps. Following the Russian Revolution of 1917 he moved to newly-renascent Poland and in 1918 entered the Academy of Fine Arts in Warsaw. There he started his studies in the class of Stanisław Lentz. However, already in 1920 he quit the academy and volunteered for the Polish Army.

Polish-Soviet War
An ardent pacifist, Czapski asked for any service that would not involve active struggle. His plea was accepted and he was sent to Russia with a mission of finding the whereabouts of the officers of Czapski's former regiment, taken captive by the Bolsheviks in the course of the Russian Civil War. He reached St. Petersburg, where he met, among others, Dmitry Filosofov, Zinaida Gippius, Aleksey Remizov and Dmitry Merezhkovsky who later became his long-time friend. His mission was concluded when he found out that the officers had been executed by the Bolsheviks. Under Merezhkovsky's influence Czapski gave up his pacifist ideals and, upon his return to Poland, joined the ranks of the Polish Army and fought as a NCO in the crew of one of the armoured trains on the fronts of the Polish-Soviet War. For his merits he was awarded the Virtuti Militari, the highest Polish military decoration.

Paris Committee and Second World War
In 1921, Czapski entered the Academy of Fine Arts in Kraków, where he was taught by Wojciech Weiss and Józef Pankiewicz. Moving away from the classical tradition, he moved to Paris in 1924 where he helped to develop the Komitet Paryski (Paris Committee, subsequently abbreviated to the "Kapist" movement). Czapski began to hold exhibitions of his work but, encouraged by Ludwik Hering, increasingly moved to becoming a critic, writing essays on art, literature, and philosophy. Here he discovered Proust's À la recherche du temps perdu, which he read in French and wrote about in Polish. He returned to Poland in 1932, re-enlisting in 1939. He was subsequently captured by the Russians and was successively interned in prison and labor camps in the USSR: Starobilsk, in eastern Ukraine, Pawliszczew Bor, in Smolensk Oblast, and Gryazovets, even further north, near the city of Vologda; here his love for Proust was crucial to his survival. In a barrack he lectured the internees with quotations from memory and this gave him the strength to overcome the extreme existential discomfort. He was one of 395 who avoided the fate of more than 20,000 murdered at Katyn and similar massacres.

After the 1941 German invasion of Russia and signing the Sikorski-Mayski Agreement, Czapski joined the Polish II Corps under the command of General Anders. Between 1941 and 1942, Czapski was tasked with investigating the disappearance of Poles who had been in the captivity of the NKVD and subsequently massacred. He never received any satisfactory answers as to the fate of these men, but wrote about his experiences in two books, Reminiscences of Starobyelsk (1944) and The Inhuman Land (1949). During that period Czapski also met Aleksey Nikolayevich Tolstoy and Anna Akhmatova who is said to have dedicated one of her poems to him.

Anders subsequently removed his army through the Persian Corridor, and in Baghdad Czapski began writing for the Polish army newspapers Orzeł Biały ('White Eagle') and Kurier Polski ('Polish Courier').

Emigration 

Czapski ended the war in Rome, and moved to France in 1946. Together with Maria Czapska, Gustaw Herling-Grudziński and Jerzy Giedroyc, he established the Instytut Literacki (Literary Institute) at Maisons-Laffitte, where he lived until his death, and contributed to the Polish émigré literary journal 'Kultura'. He published also in the French press, including „Le Figaro Littéraire”, „Preuves”, „Gavroche”, „Nova et Vettera”, „Carrefour”. He co-organized Congress for Cultural Freedom in Berlin (1950).

At first his major work was not deemed worthy of publication by many French publishers, despite the support of André Malraux and Raymond Aron. It was finally published in 1949 under the title The Inhuman Land, thanks to Daniel Halévy, at the very anti-communist Éditions Self.

His paintings were exhibited in France, Switzerland, Great Britain, Brazil and Belgium. His works were virtually inaccessible in Poland – after Polish October he had 1957 exhibitions in National Museum in Poznań and Kraków Society of Friends of Fine Arts, but the next one was held only in 1986 in  Warsaw.

He signed a letter of Polish émigré writers who supported the Letter of 59. Polish People's Republic censored information about Czapski and had his name on a list of the people completely banned from publication. His literary and artistic works were popularized in Poland only after 1989.

Czapski died 12 January 1993, and three days later was buried on a cemetery in Le Mesnil-le-Roi, by the side of his sister Maria, who died in 1981.

Czapski was awarded the Silver Cross of the Order of Virtuti Militari (1918–1920) and the Commander's Cross of the Order of Polonia Restituta  (1990).

Private life 
Czapski was deeply Catholic, and his faith influenced his works and personal philosophy, but also his struggles with sexuality.  In the years 1924-1926 he entered a relationship with a poet Sergey Nabokov, younger brother of Vladimir Nabokov; it was ended by Czapski's departure to London, in order to cure his typhoid fever. Returning to Poland, Czapski met the writer Ludwik Hering. The pair lived together for a few years in Józefów, and despite the fact that they were separated by World War 2 and subsequent emigration of Czapski, they maintained the love for years by exchanging letters.

English translation
The Inhuman Land is the first work of Czapski's translated into English and was published in London in 1951. Because it is a first-hand account of contemporaneous negotiations with the Soviets over the missing Polish officers it became an important document until Russian guilt for the massacres was acknowledged. In the post-war period Czapski was also among the eyewitnesses of the situation of Polish prisoners in Soviet captivity and testified on the matter before the United States Congress.

His Lost Time: Lectures on Proust in a Soviet Prison Camp was translated into English in 2018.

The Jozef Czapski Pavilion
In 2016, The National Museum of Krakow inaugurated the Jozef Czapski Pavilion on the grounds of the Emeryk Hutten-Czapski Museum. The pavilion is dedicated to the grandson of the most important numismatic collector in Poland, and the permanent exhibition is about his life and work. The exhibition displays some of his diaries and paintings, as well as various multimedia presentations on his work and life. One of the exhibitions is an exact recreation of the room he lived in at the Kultura house in Maisons-Laffitte in France. The pavilion was designed by Krystyna Zachwatowicz and her husband, the film director, Andrzej Wajda.

Notes and references

External links
 Biography: 
 Pictures:

Further reading
 

1896 births
1993 deaths
Artists from Prague
Polish memoirists
Polish literary critics
Polish essayists
Polish male writers
Male essayists
20th-century Polish painters
20th-century Polish male artists
Recipients of the Silver Cross of the Virtuti Militari
Commanders of the Order of Polonia Restituta
Polish Army officers
Katyn massacre investigators
Polish people of World War II
Polish military personnel of World War II
Polish prisoners and detainees
Polish prisoners of war
World War II prisoners of war held by the Soviet Union
Academy of Fine Arts in Warsaw alumni
Writers from Prague
20th-century essayists
Polish LGBT painters
Polish LGBT writers
Polish male painters
20th-century memoirists
People associated with the magazine "Kultura"